The Women's 200m Individual Medley event at the 2003 Pan American Games took place on August 16, 2003 (Day 15 of the Games).

Medalists

Records

Results

References

2003 Pan American Games Results: Day 15, CBC online; retrieved 2009-06-13.
usaswimming

Medley, Women's 200m
2003 in women's swimming
Swim